Welington Pereira Rodrigues (born 4 January 1986), commonly known as Gum, is a Brazilian footballer who plays for CRB as a central defender.

He spent nine years with Fluminense, making 414 total appearances and scoring 28 goals, while winning the Campeonato Brasileiro Série A in 2010 and 2012.

Club career

Marília
Born in São Paulo, Gum was a Marília youth graduate. He made his first team debut in 2005, with the side in Série B, and also had an unassuming loan spell at Osvaldo Cruz back in 2004.

On 13 September 2006 Gum was loaned to Série A club Internacional, until July. The following March, after making no league appearances, he rescinded his contract and returned to MAC.

Ponte Preta
On 26 June 2008 Gum signed a five-year deal with fellow second-tier club Ponte Preta, who acquired 50% of his federative rights. He was an immediate starter for the club after his arrival, impressing in the following year's Campeonato Paulista.

Fluminense
On 17 August 2009 Gum joined Fluminense in the top flight. He made his debut in the league thirteen days later, in a 2–0 away defeat to Santos.

Gum scored his first goals in the top flight of Brazilian football on 18 October 2009, netting a brace in a 2–2 home draw against Internacional. He finished the campaign with 16 appearances and three goals, as his side narrowly avoided relegation.

Gum was also an important unit during the club's 2009 Copa Sudamericana run, scoring a goal against Cerro Porteño which secured  qualification to the final; he also scored the final goal in a 3–0 home win against LDU Quito in the second leg, as his side finished runners up (5-4 on aggregate).

Gum was a first-choice during Flu's 2010 Brasileirão winning campaign, partnering Leandro Euzébio to form the best defence in the league. He was also an undisputed starter in 2012, winning another title.

In January 2015 Gum signed a new four-year deal with Fluminense. In his last game of the season, he scored the first in a 3–1 home win against Avaí; it was also his 300th appearance for the club.

On 16 September 2018, as his contract entered its final stages, Gum made his 400th appearance for Fluminense in their 3–1 national league defeat away to Athletico Paranaense. In doing so, he entered their top ten appearance-makers of all time, eventually finishing in eighth with 414.

Later career
In March 2019, Gum moved to Chapecoense on a one-year deal with the option of a second. He played 20 times in his one national campaign for the team from Santa Catarina, scoring in a 2–1 loss away to Flamengo – main rivals of his former employer – on 12 May.

Gum transferred again on 12 February 2020, joining CRB of the Campeonato Alagoano. He played five games in his first state season as they won the title, including a 1–0 final win over rivals CSA in the final on 5 August.

Career statistics

Honours
Fluminense
Campeonato Brasileiro: 2010, 2012
Taça Guanabara: 2012
Campeonato Carioca: 2012
Primeira Liga: 2016

CRB
Campeonato Alagoano: 2020

Individual 
 Campeonato Carioca Team of the year: 2018

References

External links

1986 births
Living people
Footballers from São Paulo
Brazilian footballers
Association football defenders
Campeonato Brasileiro Série A players
Campeonato Brasileiro Série B players
Marília Atlético Clube players
Sport Club Internacional players
Associação Atlética Ponte Preta players
Fluminense FC players
Associação Chapecoense de Futebol players
Clube de Regatas Brasil players